Mahira is a 2019 Indian Kannada-language crime action film written and  directed by Mahesh Gowda and produced by Vivek Kodappa and his friends under the banner The Jackfruit Productions. It features Raj B. Shetty and Virginia Rodrigues along with Chaitra Aachar in the lead roles. The supporting cast includes Balaji Manohar, GopalKrishna Deshpande, K P Sridhar, Babu Hirannaiah, Apoorva Soma Saakre, Shaukat Ali and Dileep Raj. The soundtrack of the film is composed by rapper Nilima Rao and Rakesh U.P and the cinematography is by Keerthan Poojary. The editing for the film is done by Ashik Kusugolli, who is currently working on the highly anticipated Kichcha Sudeep starrer Vikrant Rona . The film released on 26 July 2019.

Cast 

 Raj B.Shetty as Pratap, undercover agent 
 Virginia Rodrigues as Maya
 Chaitra Aachar as Adya
 Balaji Manohar
 GopalKrishna Deshpande  as Kashi
 K P Sridhar
 Babu Hirannaiah
 Apoorva Soma Saakre
 Shaukat Ali
 Dileep Raj as Kishore

Release and reception 
The movie released on 26 July 2019 worldwide across 80 centres. It premiered on 24 July 2019 in London.

Soundtrack 

The film's background score is done by Midhun Mukundhan . The soundtracks are composed by  Nilima Rao & Rakesh U P (RaknNili). The music rights were acquired by PRK Audio.

References

External links 

 

2010s Kannada-language films
2019 crime action films
Indian crime action films
Films shot in Mysore
Films shot in Bangalore
2019 films